Bowers is an unincorporated community in Sugar Creek Township, Montgomery County, in the U.S. state of Indiana.

History
Bowers was platted by Christina and L. M. Dunbar in 1901.
L. M. Dunbar was Lewis Morton Dunbar.
Bowers was originally named "Bowers Station" and was a railroad stop.

Geography

References

Unincorporated communities in Montgomery County, Indiana
Unincorporated communities in Indiana